Kélian Nsona Wa Saka (born 11 May 2002) is a French professional footballer who plays as a forward for Bundesliga club Hertha BSC.

Professional career
On 4 September 2019, Nsona signed his first professional contract with Stade Malherbe Caen. He made his professional debut with Caen in a 1–0 Ligue 2 win over AS Nancy on 2 December 2019.

On 31 January 2022, Nsona signed with Bundesliga club Hertha BSC.

Personal life
Born in France, Nsona is of Congolese  and Cameroonian descent.

References

External links
 Profile at the Hertha BSC website
 
 Kélian Nsona at SM Caen 
 
 

2002 births
Living people
People from Ivry-sur-Seine
French footballers
France youth international footballers
French sportspeople of Democratic Republic of the Congo descent
French sportspeople of Cameroonian descent
Association football forwards
Stade Malherbe Caen players
Hertha BSC players
Ligue 2 players
Championnat National 3 players
French expatriate footballers
Expatriate footballers in Germany
French expatriate sportspeople in Germany
Black French sportspeople